Heartbound is a role-playing video game developed by American indie developer Pirate Software. The game centers around a boy who deals with depression, anxiety, and fear as he embarks on a journey through different locations in search of his dog, Baron. The narrative changes with different pathways and endings, depending on how the player interacts with the environment, other characters, and combat system. Each choice or interaction has the potential to change the game by adding dialog, encounters, or interactive objects to the world.

An alpha version of the game was released for Microsoft Windows, OS X, and Linux in November 2016 on Steam Greenlight. The game was greenlit by the community in ten days and received enough support to reach the top game on the platform for that time period. A beta was then released for Microsoft Windows, OS X, and Linux in February 2017 along with a Kickstarter crowdfunding campaign. This campaign was successful within its first 24 hours, and the game is now in development for the final release. 

Initially scheduled for a full release in December 2017, the game is currently planned to be released in sections; an early access version of the game has been released in December 2018, and content will be added over time through patches.

Gameplay 
Heartbound is a role-playing game that borrows many conventions from other gaming genres. Progress is achieved by exploration and player choice, and how the player interacts with the world shapes the story line and the environment for the rest of the play-through. According to the Pirate Software website:

 "Every time you interact with an object, talk to an NPC, forget to turn off a light-switch, take out the trash, or disregard a sparkly bush the game remembers this and will change subtly for all further interactions. The greatest part about this design is that it already works and is in the current builds of the game. Both minor and major differences are going to pop up throughout the game and give the community something to share with one another. Everything you do matters no matter what kind of player you are or choose to be."

Alternate reality game 
A series of cryptographic puzzles can be solved outside of Heartbound, available from the game's website. These puzzles provide additional lore and offer an alternative narrative parallel to the game. Completing portions of the Alternate reality game (ARG) can foreshadow or unlock additional game content.

Combat 

Heartbound doesn't use the traditional systems of levels, experience, or consumables; everything is skill-based and combat can change, based on the player's actions and relationships with others. Equipment can be found throughout the world, which augments Lore's damage and maximum health. Every enemy has unique mini-games that are not encountered anywhere else in the game. There are no random battles, and a number of encounters are avoidable based on how the player progresses.

Development 
Hall lists Secret of Mana, EarthBound (and the Mother series), Wario Ware, Secret of Evermore, and 1o57 as sources of inspiration for Heartbound.

Heartbound was initially greenlit on Steam in December 2016, slated for release into Steam early access in 2017. Pirate Software then launched a Kickstarter campaign for the game on February 24, 2017, which met its funding goal less than two days and finished on March 26 raising $19,272 of its $5,000 goal. Nearly a year later, Heartbound released into Steam early access on Christmas Day of 2018, featuring the first of the game's five acts and an expansion to the game's companion alternate reality game.

Over the next five years, Heartbound would continue development, with much of it streamed live on the studio's Twitch channel. Due to the increased scope of the game brought on by the Kickstarter campaign's stretch goals, as well as members of the studio becoming afflicted with COVID-19 in early 2020, the game continues to suffer numerous delays, remaining in active development as of July 2022. To assuage the concerns of backers becoming anxious about the title's lengthy development process, the studio began releasing monthly update videos in 2022.

Reception 
Heartbounds alpha and beta releases were both very well received. Both IGN and Game Skinny have shown interest in the direction the game is headed. The game is currently holding the No. 2 spot for top indie release on Game Jolt.

Due to the mechanical and visual similarities with Undertale, many comparisons would be drawn between the two games, leading to a controversy involving popular YouTuber MatPat regarding the game's standalone nature instead of its existence in reference to Undertale.

Video game music label Materia Collective released a preview version of the soundtrack by composer Stijn van Wakeren on July 13, 2018.

References 

Early access video games
Indie video games
MacOS games
Linux games
Upcoming video games
Video games about dogs
Video games about mental health
Video games developed in the United States
Windows games